Littorine is a tropane alkaloid found in a variety of plants including Datura and Atropa belladonna.  It is closely related in chemical structure to atropine, hyoscyamine, and scopolamine, which all share a common biosynthetic pathway.

See also 
Catuabine
Scopine

References 

Tropane alkaloids
Tropane alkaloids found in Solanaceae
Carboxylate esters